The Class A (open class) was one of three motorboating classes contested on the Water motorsports at the 1908 Summer Olympics programme. Nations could enter up to 3 boats.

The open class was scheduled to take place on the first day of competition, 28 August. The race was a 40 nautical miles long. Two boats, Wolseley-Siddely and Dylan, began the race. Dylan abandoned the race partway through the first lap, with Wolseley-Siddely finishing the first before the weather became too severe to continue the race.

A second attempt to run the event took place the next day, after the other two races had been completed. Wolseley-Siddely again started, this time against Camille (the only French boat to take part in competition). Wolseley-Siddely ran aground on a mud spit, leaving Camille to finish alone for the gold medal.

Results

References

See also
 
 
 

Class A